Édouard Max-Robert (5 July 1905 – 16 July 1996) was a French hurdler. He competed in the men's 400 metres hurdles at the 1928 Summer Olympics.

References

External links
 

1905 births
1996 deaths
Athletes (track and field) at the 1928 Summer Olympics
French male hurdlers
Olympic athletes of France
Athletes from Paris
20th-century French people